The Copa del Generalísimo 1961 Final was the 59th final of the King's Cup. The final was played at Santiago Bernabéu Stadium in Madrid, on 2 July 1961, being won by Club Atlético de Madrid, who beat Real Madrid 3–2. The final was a rematch of the previous year's title game, which was also won by Atlético.

Details

See also
Madrid derby

References

1961
Copa
Real Madrid CF matches
Atlético Madrid matches
Madrid Derby matches